Nicolò Carucci (born 22 February 2001 in Milan) is an Italian rower.

He won the gold medal in the single sculls at European U23 Championships in 2020.

References

External links

2001 births
Living people
Italian male rowers
21st-century Italian people
World Rowing Championships medalists for Italy